Bank Simpanan Nasional (English: National Savings Bank) (BSN) is a government owned bank based in Malaysia. BSN offers banking services via BSN branches and BSN Banking Agents (EB BSN). BSN was incorporated on 1 December 1974 under the Minister of Finance at that time, Tengku Razaleigh Hamzah.

History
Bank Simpanan Nasional was incorporated on 1 December 1974, under the Bank Simpanan Nasional Act, which replaced the Post Office Savings Bank set up in 1948.

Subsidiaries and associates
The agency has subsidiaries and associates which are involved in asset management, insurance and takaful:
 Permodalan BSN Berhad (unit trust fund management)
 Prudential BSN Takaful Berhad (takaful)
 Gibraltar BSN Life Berhad (life insurance)

See also
 Post Office Savings Bank (Singapore)
 List of banks in Malaysia

References

Further reading

External links
BSN info website
myBSN website (Internet Banking)

1974 establishments in Malaysia
Government-owned companies of Malaysia
Simpanan
Banks established in 1974
Companies based in Kuala Lumpur
Malaysian brands
Ministry of Finance (Malaysia)
Privately held companies of Malaysia